The Pan American Table Tennis Cup is an annual table tennis competition held in the Americas since 2017. It consists of men's and women's singles events. Only 16 invited players and no more than 2 players per association are allowed to participate in each event. Since its inception, it is recognised as the qualification event for the Table Tennis World Cup. The competitions are organized as a joint effort of the Latin American Table Tennis Union and the Northern American Table Tennis Union. The event is sanctioned by the International Table Tennis Federation (ITTF).

Results

Men's singles

Women's singles

Medal table

See also
 Pan American Table Tennis Championships
 Table tennis at the Pan American Games

References 

 
Table tennis competitions
Table tennis in Latin America
Table tennis in North America
Table tennis in South America
Sports competitions in the Americas
Recurring sporting events established in 2017